Juanita Moore (October 19, 1914 – January 1, 2014) was an American film, television, and stage actress.

She was the fifth black actor to be nominated for an Academy Award in any category, and the third in the Supporting Actress category at a time when only one black actor, Hattie McDaniel in Gone with the Wind (1939), had won an Oscar.

Her most famous role was as Annie Johnson in the film Imitation of Life (1959).

Early life and career

Juanita Moore was born in Greenwood, Mississippi, the daughter of Ella (née Dunn) and Harrison Moore. She had seven siblings (six sisters and one brother). Her family moved in the Great Migration to Los Angeles, where she was raised. Moore first performed as a dancer, part of a chorus line at the Cotton Club before becoming a film extra while working in theater.

Moore was the vice president of the Original Cambridge Players, who took a Los Angeles production of The Amen Corner to Broadway at the Ethel Barrymore Theater in April 1965. She was friends with Marlon Brando and James Baldwin. It was Moore who asked Brando to lend the funds ($75) to Baldwin to write the play.

After making her film debut in Double Deal (1939), Moore had a number of bit parts and supporting roles in motion pictures through the late 1930s and 1950s.

Moore's performance in the remake of Imitation of Life (1959) as black housekeeper Annie Johnson, whose daughter Sarah Jane (Susan Kohner) passes for white, won her a nomination for an Academy Award for Best Supporting Actress. She was also nominated for the Golden Globe Award for Best Supporting Actress in a Motion Picture for the role. When the two versions of Imitation of Life were released together on DVD (the earlier film was released in 1934), one of the bonus features was a new interview with Moore.

Moore continued to act for film and TV, with a role in Disney's The Kid (2000), and guest-starring roles on Dragnet, Adam-12, Marcus Welby, M.D., ER and Judging Amy.

On April 23, 2010, a new print of Imitation of Life (1959) was screened at the Turner Classic Movies Film Festival in Los Angeles. Both Moore and co-star Kohner attended. After the screening, the two women appeared on stage for a question-and-answer session hosted by TCM's Robert Osborne. Moore and Kohner received standing ovations.

Personal life
Moore was married for 50 years to Charles Burris, who died in 2001. He was a Los Angeles bus driver and they met when she stepped out in front of his approaching bus. She and Burris married a few weeks later.

Her grandson is actor/producer Kirk E. Kelleykahn, who is CEO/President of "Cambridge Players – Next Generation", a theatre troupe whose founding members included Moore.

Death
Moore died at her home in Los Angeles on January 1, 2014, at age 99 of natural causes. She is buried at Inglewood Park Cemetery.

Partial filmography

 Double Deal (1939) as Nightclub Patron (uncredited)
 Belle Starr (1941) as Dressed Up Freed Slave (uncredited)
 Broken Strings (1942) as Nightclub Patron (uncredited)
 Star Spangled Rhythm (1942) as Dancer (uncredited)
 Cabin in the Sky (1943) as Nightclub Patron / Churchgoer (uncredited)
 Pinky (1949) as Nurse (uncredited)
 Tarzan's Peril (1951) as Native Woman (uncredited)
 No Questions Asked (1951) as Maid in Lounge (uncredited)
 Skirts Ahoy! (1952) as Black Drill Team Member (uncredited)
 Lydia Bailey (1952) as Marie (uncredited)
 Affair in Trinidad (1952) as Dominique
 The Iron Mistress (1952) as Juanita – Judalon's Maid (uncredited)
 The Royal African Rifles (1953) as Elderly Woman
 Witness to Murder (1954) as Negress – Mental Patient
 The Gambler from Natchez (1954) as Yvette's Maid (uncredited)
 Women's Prison (1955) as Polyclinic 'Polly' Jones
 Lord of the Jungle (1955) as Molu's Wife (uncredited)
 Not as a Stranger (1955) as Mrs. Clara Bassett (uncredited)
 Ransom! (1956) as Shirley Lorraine
 The Opposite Sex (1956) as Powder Room Attendant (uncredited)
 The Girl Can't Help It (1956) as Hilda
 Something of Value (1957) as Tribal Woman (uncredited)
 Band of Angels (1957) as Budge (uncredited)
 The Helen Morgan Story (1957) as Lucey – Backstage Maid (uncredited)
 Bombers B-52 (1957) as Clarissa (uncredited)
 The Green-Eyed Blonde (1957) as Miss Randall (uncredited)
 Imitation of Life (1959) as Annie Johnson
 Tammy Tell Me True (1961) as Della
 Walk on the Wild Side (1962) as Mama
 A Child Is Waiting (1963) as Julius' Mother (uncredited)
 Papa's Delicate Condition (1963) as Ellie
 The Singing Nun (1966) as Sister Mary
 Rosie! (1967) as Nurse
 Gentle Ben (1967) as Mama Jolie
 Uptight (1968) as Mama Wells
 Angelitos negros (1970) as Nana Mercé
 Skin Game (1971) as Viney (Calloway slave)
 The Mack (1973) as Mother – Mrs. Mickens
 Fox Style (1973) as Hattie Fox
 Thomasine & Bushrod (1974) as Pecolia
 The Get-Man (1974)
 Abby (1974) as Miranda 'Momma' Potter
 Joey (1975)
 Fugitive Lovers (1975) as Assemblywoman Griffith
 Everybody Rides the Carousel (1975) as Stage 8 (voice)
 Paternity (1981) as Celia
 O'Hara's Wife (1982) as Ethel
 And They're Off (1982) as Sadie Johnson
 Two Moon Junction (1988) as Delilah
 The Sterling Chase (1999) as Grandma Jones (voice)
 Disney's The Kid (2000) as Kenny's Grandmother – Voice

References

External links

1914 births
2014 deaths
20th-century American actresses
Actresses from Los Angeles
Actresses from Mississippi
African-American actresses
American film actresses
American television actresses
People from Greenwood, Mississippi
20th-century African-American women
20th-century African-American people
21st-century African-American people
21st-century African-American women
Burials at Inglewood Park Cemetery